Ecuador competed in the 2019 Pan American Games in Lima, Peru from July 26 to August 11, 2019.

On 10 July 2019, the Ecuadorian National Olympic Committee officially named the team of 191 athletes competing in twenty eight sports. Weightlifter Tamara Salazar was named as the country's flag bearer during the opening ceremony.

The Ecuadorian team consisted of 201 athletes, the largest ever team the country has ever sent to the Pan American Games.

Medalists

The following Ecuadorian competitors won medals at the games.

|  style="text-align:left; width:78%; vertical-align:top;"|

|  style="text-align:left; width:26%; vertical-align:top;"|

Competitors
The following is the list of number of competitors (per gender) participating at the games per sport/discipline.

Archery

Men

Badminton

Ecuador qualified a team of two badminton athletes (one per gender).

Singles

Doubles

Bodybuilding

Ecuador qualified a full team of two bodybuilders (one male and one female).

There were no results in the pre-judging stage, with only the top six advancing.

Bowling

Ecuador qualified two women bowlers.

Boxing

Ecuador qualified four boxers (three men and one woman).

Men

Women

  Jessica Caicedo, of Colombia, lost the gold medal for doping violation.

Equestrian

Ecuador qualified five equestrians.

Dressage

Eventing

Jumping

Football

Men's tournament

Ecuador qualified a men's team of 18 athletes.

Golf

Ecuador qualified three golfers (one man and two women).

Modern pentathlon

Ecuador qualified four modern pentathletes (two men and two women).

Men
2 quotas

Women
2 quotas

Racquetball

Ecuador qualified four racquetball athletes (two men and two women).

Men
2 quotas 

Women
2 quotas

Sailing

Men

Women

Mixed

Open

Shooting

Ecuador qualified seven sport shooters (three men and four women).

Men

Women

Mixed

Surfing

Ecuador qualified six surfers (three men and three women) in the sport's debut at the Pan American Games.

Artistic

Race

Table tennis

Men

Women

Mixed

Taekwondo

Kyorugi (sparring)
Men

Women

Poomsae (forms)

Tennis

Men

Women

Weightlifting

Ecuador qualified a full team of 12 weightlifters (six man and six women).

Men

Women

Wrestling

Men

Women

References

Nations at the 2019 Pan American Games
2019
2019 in Ecuadorian sport